Changli is a county of northeastern Hebei province, China, with some Bohai Sea coast. It is under the administration of the Qinhuangdao City, and borders Funing County and Luan County. Both Beijing–Harbin Railway and China National Highway 205 pass through this county.

Changli is one of the largest of China's winemaking districts, with 80 per cent of the county's tillable land used for growing Cabernet Sauvignon grapes. For this reason, Changli is sometimes called China's "Bordeaux region".

Administrative divisions

The county administers 11 towns and 5 townships.

Climate

Notable people
 Zhang Guangming (1913-2016) veteran fighter pilot of the War of Resistance-World War II, and Major General of the Chinese Air Force

References

External links
Official Changli government website

County-level divisions of Hebei
Wine regions of China
Qinhuangdao